Kottamala (கோட்டமலை - കോട്ടമല) is the highest peak in Southern part of Western Ghats located in Periyar tiger reserve in Idukki district of Kerala and near Rajapalayam in the Srivilliputhur Grizzled Squirrel Wildlife Sanctuary in Tamil Nadu is a tall mountain peak situated in the Western Ghats at an altitude of 2,019m. It is one of the few tall peaks in the Western Ghats; and the highest peak of all in the Periyar plateau exceeding 2,000m.]). 

There is also a temple in the foothills of Kottamalai called Kottamalai karuppasami temple in Tamil Nadu. 

(Not to be confused with Kottaimalai of Vellore in Tamil Nadu)

References

RameshChristopher

Mountains of Kerala
Mountains of Tamil Nadu
Mountains of the Western Ghats